The Dhor Koli also known as Tokre Koli, or Tokare Koli is a subcaste of the Koli caste found in the Indian states of Maharashtra, Gujarat, Karnataka and Rajasthan.  Dhor Kolis are bamboo cutters by profession.

Origin and distribution 
The Dhor Kolis derived their name from the Kannada word for 'big', ; they are also known as Tokre Kolis because they were bamboo cutters. They have traditionally had a reputation for alleged dacoity.

They are distributed in the Nashik, Thane and Greater Mumbai districts of Maharashtra and are also found in Surat and Dang districts of Gujarat.

Clans 
The Dhor Kolis are divided into several clans. Their prominent clans include:

 Ambekar
 Pawar
 Pardhi
 Arde
 Sapta
 Misal
 Padkar
 Khanya
 Chaudhary
 Gaekwad
 Ghatal
 Gavit
 Kordha
 Shingade
 Boke
 Jadhav
 Pum
 Radheli
 Bhage

Classification 
The Dhor Kolis are classified as a Scheduled Tribe by the Government of Karnataka, Maharashtra, Gujarat, and Rajasthan states of India.

References 

Koli subcastes